Phoenix is the fifth studio album by the German symphonic black metal band Agathodaimon. The album was released on 20 March 2009.

Track listing

 The song "Alone in the Dark" is featured on the soundtrack of the 2005 film of the same name by Uwe Boll.

Personnel
 Ashtrael – vocals
 Sathonys – guitars, clean vocals
 Jan Jansohn – guitars
 Till Ottinger – bass
 Manuel Steitz – drums
 Felix Ü. Walzer – keyboards
 Frank "Akaias" Nordmann – vocals on tracks 11 and 12
 Jonas Iscariot – vocals on "Oncoming Storm"
 Kristian Kohlmannslehner – producer, engineering, mixing

References

External links
Phoenix at AllMusic

Agathodaimon (band) albums
Nuclear Blast albums
2009 albums